Puzovka is a rural locality (a village) in Tolshmenskoye Rural Settlement, Totemsky District, Vologda Oblast, Russia. The population was 15 as of 2002.

Geography 
Puzovka is located 77 km south of Totma (the district's administrative centre) by road. Nikolskoye is the nearest rural locality.

References 

Rural localities in Tarnogsky District